Tim Read is an Australian politician. He has been a Greens member of the Victorian Legislative Assembly since November 2018, representing the seat of Brunswick. A former general practitioner, and medical researcher with a PhD on the epidemiology of sexually transmitted infections, he is the current Victorian Greens Spokesperson for Health, Justice, Integrity and Science.

Early life 
Born in Melbourne in 1962.

Read attended the University of Melbourne, where he graduated with a Bachelor of Medicine, Bachelor of Surgery degree in 1985.

He worked as a general practitioner in a number of inner-city and suburban community health centres.

Read began specialty training, and from 1998 was sexual health physician and became medical coordinator of the HIV clinic at the Melbourne Sexual Health Centre, and from 2005 as a sessional sexual health physician at the Royal Melbourne Hospital.

He completed a Postgraduate Diploma of Epidemiology in 2007, and in 2014, he completed his Doctor of Philosophy, titled ‘Studies in the epidemiology of human papillomavirus, the early detection of anal cancer and the control of human immunodeficiency virus.’

As a medical researcher Read has since published over 60 peer reviewed articles in medical literature, focusing largely on human papillomavirus, HIV treatment and prevention, and Mycoplasma genitalium.

From 2015 he was a National Health and Medical Research Council early career research fellow at Monash University.

State politics 
Read had previously run for the Greens at the 2013 federal election for Wills, and at the 2014 Victorian election for Brunswick. In the 2018 Victorian election he contested and won the seat of Brunswick, the first-time a non-Labor aligned MP had been elected in the seat’s history.

In Parliament, Read has campaigned on the issues of climate change, the over-incarceration and deaths in custody of Aboriginal Victorians, and the promotion of active transportation and bike safety. His inaugural speech in Parliament listed Victoria’s biggest public health challenges as: heatwaves and climate change, our approach to drugs and crime, and diabetes.

In 2019, he called for pill-testing and the decriminalisation of public drunkenness in his first two adjournment matters, for the later calling on the Attorney-General to ‘form a working group to establish a process to care for people found to be intoxicated in public’ and to ‘establish appropriate facilities, instead of relying on police cells’ - the path to decriminalisation ultimately announced by the Victorian government later that year.

A prodigious drafter of private members bills, in his first term he was responsible for the Victorian Green’s bills to introduce pill-testing, reform Victoria’s bail laws, raise the age of criminal responsibility to 14, and to strengthen political integrity laws and the Independent Broad-based Anti-corruption Commission (IBAC). He also sought to amend legislation to raise Victoria’s renewable energy target from 50% to 100% renewable energy by 2030.

In 2020 he was credited in playing a key role in preventing a controversial change to the Judicial Proceedings Reports Act 1958 which would have potentially criminalised the families of dead victims of sexual assault naming the victim, unless they had first obtained a court order.

He was part of a successful campaign to reduce restrictions on gay men donating blood, although he continues to advocate for a further easing of the remaining restrictions.

COVID-19 pandemic 
Read is the only medical doctor currently sitting in the Victorian Parliament, and has been the Victorian Greens Spokesperson for Health throughout the COVID-19 pandemic.

The Victorian Greens adopted a non-partisan, health and science backed policy to manage the pandemic, largely seeking to work collaboratively with the Victorian Labor Government during the crisis, including negotiating the controversial amendments to the Public Health and Wellbeing Act 2008. However, Read also publicly spoke against the ‘military’ response of Victoria Police towards anti-lockdown protesters, and against the need for Victorians to be locked out of their State when the COVID-19 virus was already known to be circulating in Victoria.

Noting rising COVID-19 hospitalisations, in May 2022 he accused the government of ‘sleepwalking towards a health crisis’, and advocated for a government to launch a preemptive public health campaign for winter to promote masks, indoor air-quality and government grants for HEPA filters, and vaccination. Despite support from the Australian Medical Association, the Victorian Premier criticised his calls as “pure rank politics”, stating, “I’m terribly sorry but I’m not taking public health advice from them (the Greens), I’m just not.” 

The Premier reiterated this stance in a response to Read in question time on 7 June stating, “On the notion that Victorians need to be reminded about the efficacy of mask wearing, the clear public health benefits of mask wearing, together with the benefits of getting vaccinated… I reckon that Victorians know a bit about all of that because they have lived it for 2½ years. So, with the greatest of respect to the member for Brunswick, I do not think a further TV commercial campaign or a ‘campaign’, as he puts it, is necessarily needed.” 

However, when faced with over 700 Victorian covid-19 hospitalisations, on 12 July the Premier belatedly announced the program Read had been calling for, a “Stay Well for Winter Campaign” across TV, radio, outdoor and digital channels focusing on mask wearing, ventilation and vaccination, as well as an extension of the HEPA filter government grant program.

In July 2022 Read called for the government to offer people free masks to people on public transport, a move subsequently announced by the Victorian government in August that year.

Academic Research 
As a medical researcher Read has contributed to over 60 peer reviewed articles in medical literature, including:

 "Outcomes of Resistance-guided Sequential Treatment of Mycoplasma genitalium Infections: A Prospective Evaluation." 
 "Provision of rapid HIV tests within a health service and frequency of HIV testing among men who have sex with men: randomised controlled trial." 
 "The near disappearance of genital warts in young women 4 years after commencing a national human papillomavirus (HPV) vaccination programme." 
 "Should we start screening for anal squamous intra-epithelial lesions in HIV-infected homosexual men?." 
 "Oral human papillomavirus in men having sex with men: risk-factors and sampling." 
 "Symptoms, Sites, and Significance of Mycoplasma genitalium in Men Who Have Sex with Men". 
 "Size of anal squamous cell carcinomas at diagnosis: A retrospective case series." 
 "Use of Pristinamycin for Macrolide-Resistant Mycoplasma genitalium Infection." 
 "HIV Testing With and Without a Clinical Consultation Among Men Who Have Sex With Men: A Randomized Controlled Trial." 
 "Non-consensual condom removal, reported by patients at a sexual health clinic in Melbourne, Australia." 
 "Sensitivity of HIV rapid tests compared with fourth-generation enzyme immunoassays or HIV RNA tests."

References

Living people
Australian Greens members of the Parliament of Victoria
Members of the Victorian Legislative Assembly
21st-century Australian politicians
1962 births